Genoa Park is a  urban park along the west bank of the Scioto River in Columbus, Ohio, United States. The park, located between Broad and Rich Streets, is named after Genoa, the birthplace of Christopher Columbus and one of Columbus' sister cities. It opened in 1999.

History
The park was expanded from 2011 to 2015, along with the parks along the entire Scioto River. The parks have helped revitalize the city's downtown area.

Attributes
The park follows the curve of the Scioto River on its western bank. The Oval, an open green space, was underwater prior to the Main Street Dam removal in 2013.

The park features an amphitheater and fountains. Public artwork and monuments include Celebration of Life, the Columbus Police Memorial, several works as part of Scioto Lounge, and the statue of Lucas Sullivant.

The river bank features a riparian zone, a natural line of plants along the river, keeping soil from eroding into the water.

Gallery

See also

 List of parks in Columbus, Ohio

References

External links

 
 Scioto Mile page

1999 establishments in Ohio
Broad Street (Columbus, Ohio)
Franklinton (Columbus, Ohio)
Parks in Columbus, Ohio
Protected areas established in 1999